Der Volksfreund (German for "The People's Friend") can refer to:

Der Volksfreund, Buffalo, New York, United States
Cincinnati Volksfreund, Cincinnati, Ohio, United States
Süderländer Volksfreund, a publication of Lüdenscheider Nachrichten in Werdohl, Germany
Der Volkfreund, a Yiddish weekly published by Joseph Selig Glick in Pittsburgh, Pennsylvania